Satu Mare Airport  is an international airport located in northwest Romania,  south of Satu Mare municipality, the capital of Satu Mare County.

History
Satu Mare Airport is one of the first airports in Romania, founded on 15 October 1936. In 1938, a Junkers 34 operating the Cluj – Satu Mare – Oradea – Cluj route became the first plane to arrive at the airfield. The current runway was inaugurated in 1975. In 1996, the facility was designated as an international airport, and two years later, TAROM launched a direct flight to New York City. The service originated in Bucharest and was operated by Airbus A310s.

Airlines and destinations
The following airlines operate regular scheduled and charter flights at Satu Mare Airport:

Statistics

See also
Aviation in Romania
List of the busiest airports in Romania
Transport in Romania

References

External links
 Official website
 Google Map - Aerial View
 

Airports in Romania
Buildings and structures in Satu Mare
Transport in Satu Mare
Airports established in 1936
1936 establishments in Romania